The Kordun region is a part of central Croatia from the bottom of the Petrova Gora (Peter's mountain) mountain range, which extends along the rivers Korana and Slunjčica, and forms part of the border region to Bosnia and Herzegovina. Within Croatia, Kordun is bordered by the Lika region to the south and by Banovina or Banija to the east.

Most of Kordun with its centre Slunj belongs to Karlovac County (Slunj, Cetingrad, Krnjak, Rakovica and Vojnić). Vrginmost belongs to Sisak-Moslavina County.

In former times, this region belonged to the Habsburg Military Frontier towards the Ottoman Empire which is more or less the exact same today which the border of Croatia and Bosnia. Following the Croatian War of Independence, a number of towns and municipalities in the region were designated Areas of Special State Concern.

The area has rich wood resources. Today, the economic situation is slowly improving, but there is still a large tendency of emigration from the region to larger cities. A typical phenomenon of this region is the porous composition of the karst soil (consisting of limestone), which creates numerous crater-like dolines (sinkholes, Croatian dolina).

See also
 Geography of Croatia

Sources
 Kordun at enciklopedija.hr

External links
 Information about Kordun 

Regions of Croatia
Historical regions in Croatia
Geography of Karlovac County
Geography of Sisak-Moslavina County